Wsola  is a village in the administrative district of Gmina Jedlińsk, within Radom County, Masovian Voivodeship, in east-central Poland.

The village has an approximate population of 1,500.

References

Wsola